Yelena Nikolayevna Grosheva (born April 12, 1979) is a Russian former competitive gymnast. She won silver in the team event at the 1996 Summer Olympics and two team medals at the World Championships.

Personal life 
Grosheva was born on April 12, 1979 in Russia.

Honors and awards 

 Master of Sports of Russia
 International Master of Sports of Russia
 Honored Master of Sports of Russia

Career 
Grosheva took up gymnastics at the age of five and showed a natural talent for the sport. In 1992, she was sent to Round Lake to train as part of the national team. Her first big competition was the 1994 Junior European Championships and later the same year she went to the World Championships.

At the 1994 Goodwill Games she had a stellar competition and one of the high points of her career, being a pivotal part of the Russian gold medal winning team, and winning bronze behind Dina Kochetkova and Shannon Miller, and ahead of such stars as Lilia Podkopayeva in the women's All Around.  In 1996, Grosheva finished second all-around in the Russian Cup and became a member of the Olympic team. At the Olympic Games in Atlanta, the Russian team was in the lead after the compulsories, but in the finals she and her teammates had to compete against the noise from the American crowds and finished second behind the Americans. She placed into vault event finals, but finished a disappointing 7th. Her floor exercise scores had placed her highest among the Russians for event finals, but she was replaced by teammate Dina Kochetkova. Overall score was 32.057.

Post-competitive career 
After being hampered by injuries Grosheva retired from the sport and joined Cirque du Soleil. In March 2007, she was appointed UNICEF Canada Goodwill Ambassador with her husband.

Competitive history

See also 

 List of Olympic female gymnasts for Russia

References

External links
 
 Elena Grosheva at Gymn Forum
 
 
 

Russian female artistic gymnasts
Gymnasts at the 1996 Summer Olympics
Olympic gymnasts of Russia
Olympic silver medalists for Russia
Medalists at the World Artistic Gymnastics Championships
1979 births
Living people
Olympic medalists in gymnastics
Medalists at the 1996 Summer Olympics
Competitors at the 1994 Goodwill Games
Goodwill Games medalists in gymnastics